Malcolm John Stent  (born 14 June 1945, Saltley, Birmingham, England) is an English actor, musical performer and playwright, who lives in Solihull. He was in a band called the Timoneers, before he became a regular at The Boggery with Jasper Carrott. He has continued to perform around the Midlands ever since. He was awarded a British Empire Medal in the 2017 New Year Honours for services to entertainment and charity in Solihull.

References

External links

1945 births
Living people
English male actors
British dramatists and playwrights
English folk musicians
People from Birmingham, West Midlands
Comedians from Birmingham, West Midlands
British male dramatists and playwrights
Recipients of the British Empire Medal